WHMD (107.1 FM) is a radio station broadcasting a country music format. Licensed to Hammond, Louisiana, United States, the station serves Tangipahoa Parish and surrounding areas. The station is currently owned by North Shore Broadcasting Co., Inc.

History
The station was originally an adult contemporary station aimed at Hammond with the name "Star 107.1" . The station changed format some time during its former ownership by Guaranty Broadcasting to its current country music format. It assumed the slogan of former Hammond country station WKJN which was flipped by its owners to ultimately another format under the current callsign of WRQQ

References

External links
North Shore Media radio stations

Hammond, Louisiana
Radio stations in Louisiana